Peter Farazijn (born 27 January 1969 in Diksmuide) is a former Belgian racing cyclist.

Palmarès

1989
2nd Tour de Wallonie
1990
2nd De Vlaamse Pijl
3rd Kattekoers
1994
1st Grand Prix de Wallonie
1996
3rd Vuelta a Andalucía
2000
6th La Flèche Wallonne
8th Gent–Wevelgem

Grand Tour results

Tour de France
1993: 135th
1994: DNF
1995: 105th
1997: 122nd
1997: 39th
1998: 19th
1999: 63rd
2004: 107th

Vuelta a España
2001: 58th
2003: DNF

References

1969 births
Living people
Belgian male cyclists
People from Diksmuide
Cyclists from West Flanders